First Kid is a 1996 American slapstick comedy film directed by David Mickey Evans and starring Sinbad and Brock Pierce. It was mostly filmed in Richmond, Virginia.

Plot
Sam Simms is a Secret Service agent assigned by his superior Wilkes to protect President Paul Davenport's rebellious 13-year-old son Luke Davenport after Luke's behavior causes another agent Woods to be replaced for mistreating Luke in front of media cameras. Simms sees this assignment as undesirable, but a possible stepping stone to protecting the President. He fails to connect with the boy at first, and Luke continues to misbehave.

After seeing Luke get beat up by the school bully Rob, his parents punish him for the fight, even though he didn't start it. Because of the re-election, they can't risk Luke going out of public for a month while his parents are on the campaign trail. Simms feels sorry for him - he had felt alone as a teenager, too (losing his father in Vietnam while his mother worked 2-3 jobs to financially support him) - and they become friends. Simms, a former boxer, agrees to sneak Luke out against the wishes of his parents and teach him how to fight.

Meanwhile, Luke agonizes over asking the cutest girl, Katie to the school dance, which he finally does successfully with Simms's help. However, while Simms and Luke are practicing some moves for the dance, the Secret Service director Morton tells them that they can't go to the dance due to an emergency lockdown because of a duffel bag left unattended on the sidewalk outside the main entrance being investigated by the bomb squad. Simms, breaking the rules, takes Luke to the dance. There, Rob tries to attack Luke again while Simms is distracted, but this time, Luke puts him down.

After that, Secret Service agents bust the school dance and retrieve Luke. Simms is fired and not allowed to speak with Luke, who is crushed that his friend has apparently "abandoned" him. Luke, under house arrest and with a homing device attached to him, receives advice from an online friend, Mongoose12, on how to escape the White House and meet him at a local mall. Luke agrees, but it is revealed that Mongoose12 was in fact former agent Woods, who abducts him. When Luke goes missing, Simms is given another chance to protect him. With the help of his friend and former colleague Harold (a paraplegic who owns a spy shop), he quickly tracks Luke to the mall.

In a standoff, Woods says he was originally planning on returning Luke to the President so he could be a hero and get his job back, but now he wants to kill him instead, blaming Luke for making him lose his job, and even his wife. Woods tries to shoot Simms, but he takes cover and once Woods is out of bullets, Simms brings him down with a right uppercut. As other agents arrive, Woods tries to shoot Luke with a back-up revolver, but Simms jumps in front of Luke, causing him to take the intended bullet in his arm. Woods is also shot, subdued, and arrested by other arriving Secret Service agents for abduction, assault, discharging a firearm in a public place unlawfully, and attempted murder.

Simms is offered Presidential duty which he declines in order to stay with Luke full time, and so he can also spend more time with Luke's biology teacher, with whom he has formed a romantic relationship.

Cast
 Sinbad as Secret Service Agent Sam Simms
 Brock Pierce as U.S. First Son Luke Davenport
 James Naughton as U.S. President Paul Davenport
 Timothy Busfield as Secret Service Agent Woods
 Art LaFleur as Secret Service Agent Morton
 Robert Guillaume as Secret Service Agent Wilkes
 Lisa Eichhorn as U.S. First Lady Linda Davenport
 Blake Boyd as Secret Service Agent Dash
 Fawn Reed as Susan Lawrence
 Erin Williby as Katie Warren
 Zachery Ty Bryan as Rob MacArthur
 Bill Cobbs as Speet
 Tomas Arana as Harold
 Sonny Bono as himself (Cameo Appearance)
 Sean "Oleus" Sullivan as Kid In Shopping Mall Chase
 Bill Clinton as himself (Cameo Appearance)
 Jonathan Cabot Wade as School Kid

This film would turn out to be the final on-screen appearance of Sonny Bono before his death in 1998, who, at the time of the film's release, was serving in the U.S. House of Representatives. Sonny plays himself as a Congressman coming to the White House, to visit the President. Simms bumps into him (literally) outside the Oval Office and fawns over him.

Ratings
When First Kid was rated for video release by the BBFC, one minute and thirty one seconds were cut, due to the hostage attack in the shopping mall. At the time, the BBFC felt that this, and the sudden onslaught of violence, were too intense for a 'PG' certificate. In 2002, all cuts were waived for a 'PG' rating.

Reception

Box office
The movie debuted at #3, behind The Crow: City of Angels and Tin Cup. It did just over $8.4 million in ticket sales on 1,878 screens.

Critical response 
Rotten Tomatoes gives the film a score of 20%, based on reviews from 15 critics. On Metacritic it has a score of 48% based on reviews from 14 critics, indicating "mixed or average reviews". Audiences polled by CinemaScore gave the film a grade "B" on scale of A to F.

TV series
In December 1996, following the film's release discussions were held with Disney's TV division about adapting the film's premise as a TV series.

References

External links
 
 
 

1996 films
1996 comedy films
1990s children's comedy films
American children's comedy films
American political comedy films
Caravan Pictures films
Films about fictional presidents of the United States
Films about the United States Secret Service
Films directed by David M. Evans
Films produced by Roger Birnbaum
Films about bullying
Films about dysfunctional families
Films scored by Richard Gibbs
Films set in Washington, D.C.
Films set in the White House
Films shot in Virginia
Walt Disney Pictures films
1990s English-language films
1990s American films